Beebe may refer to:

People
Given name
 Beebe Steven Lynk (1872–1948), American chemist

Surname
 Beatrice Beebe (born 1946), American psychologist
 Carey Beebe (born 1960), Australian harpsichord maker
 Carolyn Beebe (1873–1950), American pianist
 Chad Beebe (born 1994), American football player
 Chase Beebe (born 1985), American mixed martial artist
 Clara W. Beebe (1868–1927), American leader of The Church of Jesus Christ of Latter-day Saints
 Dion Beebe (born 1968), Australian-born South African cinematographer
 Dan Beebe (born 1957), American football commissioner
 Don Beebe (born 1964), American football player
 Dora Beebe (died 1994), American murder victim
 Fred Beebe (1879–1957), American baseball player
 Ford Beebe (1888–1978), American screenwriter and director
 Frank Beebe (1914–2008), Canadian falconer, writer and wildlife illustrator
 Fritz Beebe (1914–1973), American newspaper publisher
 George M. Beebe (1836–1927), American politician
 Gilbert Wheeler Beebe (1912–2003), American epidemiologist and statistician
 Hank Beebe (1926–2023), American composer
 Herman K. Beebe, American fraudster
 John Beebe (born 1939), American psychiatrist
 Keith Beebe (1921–1998), American football player
 Lewis C. Beebe (1891–1951), United States Army general
 Lottie Beebe (born 1953), American school superintendent
 Lucius Beebe (1902-1966), American author, journalist, and gourmand
 Matthew Beebe (1833–1901), American businessman and politician
 Marjorie Beebe (1908–1983), American actress
 Mike Beebe (born 1946), governor of Arkansas
 Milton Earl Beebe (1840–1923), American architect
 Richard Beebe (1929–1998), American radio personality
 Reta Beebe (born 1936), American astronomer
 Robert Beebe (born 1992), American soccer player
 Roswell Beebe (1795–1856), American politician
 S. P. Beebe (1876–1930), American cancer researcher
 Steven A. Beebe (born 1950), American academic
 Troy Beebe (born 1962), American racing driver
 William Beebe (1877–1962), American naturalist, explorer, and author
 William Sully Beebe (1841–1898), American Union army officer

Places
 Beebe, Arkansas
 Beebe, Ohio, an unincorporated community
 Beebe, South Dakota, an unincorporated community
 Beebe, Washington, an unincorporated community
 Beebe, Wisconsin, an unincorporated community
 Beebe Mountain, in Washington state
 Beebe River, in New Hampshire, United States
 Beebe Windmill, in Sag Harbor, New York

Other uses
 Beebe Healthcare, serving Sussex County, Delaware, United States

See also 
 BB (disambiguation)
 Bebe (disambiguation)
 Bebee (disambiguation)
 Beeb (disambiguation)
 Beebe House (disambiguation)
 Beebe Lake (disambiguation)
 Beebe Plain (disambiguation)
 Beebee (disambiguation)
 Bibi (disambiguation)